Bădragii Vechi is a village in Edineț District, Moldova.

Notable people
 Dumitru Mârza

References

Villages of Edineț District
Populated places on the Prut
Khotinsky Uyezd
Hotin County
Ținutul Suceava